Kapu may refer to:
 Kapu (Hawaiian culture), a Hawaiian code of conduct
 Kapu (caste), a social group of India
 Kapu, Karnataka, a town in Karnataka, India
 Kapu Assembly constituency
 Kapu, Arunachal Pradesh, a settlement in Tirap district, Arunachal Pradesh, India
 Kapu, Iran, a village in Iran
 Kapu, Estonia, a village in Estonia
 Kapu Rajaiah, Indian painter
 KAPU-LP, American radio station

See also 
 Capu (disambiguation)